The 1903 Southern Intercollegiate Athletic Association football season was the college football games played by the member schools of the Southern Intercollegiate Athletic Association as part of the 1903 college football season. The season began on September 25.

1903 met difficulty in determining an SIAA champion. Clemson had the best record, but lost to an inferior North Carolina team; and in the game to secure the SIAA title were tied by Cumberland. Clemson's John Heisman pushed strongly for Cumberland to share the SIAA title. Cumberland's strongest victory was its win over Vanderbilt.

However, Sewanee beat Cumberland, yet suffered its only loss to Vanderbilt. Heisman originally challenged the winner of the Vanderbilt-Sewanee game. John J. Tigert was a star player for Vanderbilt. Nash Buckingham rated Kentucky University and Vanderbilt as best in the south.

Season overview

Results and team statistics

Key

PPG = Average of points scored per game
PAG = Average of points allowed per game

Regular season

SIAA teams in bold.

Unknown

Week One

Week Two

Week Three

Week Four

Week Five

Week Six

Week Seven

Week Eight

Week Nine

Week Ten

Week Eleven

Postseason

SIAA Championship Game

All-Southern team

Walker Reynolds Tichenor's All-Southern  team:

References